New York Album is an album by saxophonist Art Pepper recorded in 1979 at the sessions that produced So in Love but not released on the Galaxy label until 1985.

Reception

The AllMusic review by Ron Wynne calls it a "fine date".

Track listing 
All compositions by Art Pepper except where noted.
 "A Night in Tunisia" (Dizzy Gillespie, Frank Paparelli) - 9:43
 "Lover Man" (Jimmy Davis, Ram Ramirez, Jimmy Sherman) - 5:50
 "Straight, No Chaser" [alternate take] (Thelonious Monk) - 6:00
 "Duo Blues" - 7:55
 "My Friend John" - 9:47  	
Recorded at Sound Ideas Studios, NYC on February 23, 1979 (tracks 1 & 3-5) and at Kendun Recorders, Burbank, CA on May 26, 1979 (track 2)

Personnel 
Art Pepper - alto saxophone
Hank Jones - piano (tracks 1, 3 & 5)
Ron Carter - bass (tracks 1 & 3-5)
Al Foster - drums (tracks 1, 3 & 5)

References 

Art Pepper albums
1985 albums
Galaxy Records albums